Ashcombe Volleyball Club is an English volleyball club established in 1976 at The Ashcombe School in Dorking, Surrey by former England volleyball captain and PE teacher Freda Bussey.

The club's first team competes in the National Volleyball League Super 8 division and is coached by Luke Thomas.  The second team, composed mainly of junior players competes in Division 3 of the NVL and are coached by Matthew Neilson.

References

External links 
 Ashcombe Volleyball Club
 Volleyball England

English volleyball clubs
1976 establishments in England